Tom Sheridan (born 28 October 1993) is a former Australian rules footballer who last played for the Greater Western Sydney Giants in the Australian Football League (AFL), after previously playing for Fremantle for seven years.

Early career

Originally from Riddells Creek, Victoria, Sheridan attended Essendon Keilor College and played junior football for the Calder Cannons in the TAC Cup.  He showed his  endurance at the AFL pre-draft testing, finishing in the top two percent of participants in the beep test and 3 km run.  He represented Victoria Metro at the 2011 AFL Under 18 Championships and was named in the TAC Cup Team of the Year. He was drafted by Fremantle with their first selection, 16th overall, in the 2011 AFL Draft.

AFL career

Sheridan played his first game for Fremantle in the final round of the 2012 AFL season against the Melbourne Football Club after performing well in the West Australian Football League (WAFL) for Peel Thunder.

He was delisted by Fremantle at the end of the 2018 season, however shortly afterwards  picked him up as a delisted free agent for the 2019 season.

Sheridan retired from AFL in September 2020.

Statistics
 Statistics are correct to the end of the 2016 season

|-
|- style="background-color: #EAEAEA"
! scope="row" style="text-align:center" | 2012
|style="text-align:center;"|
| 11 || 1 || 0 || 0 || 3 || 2 || 5 || 1 || 1 || 0.0 || 0.0 || 3.0 || 2.0 || 5.0 || 1.0 || 1.0
|- style="background-color: #EAEAEA"
! scope="row" style="text-align:center" | 2013
|style="text-align:center;"|
| 11 || 10 || 6 || 1 || 65 || 53 || 118 || 26 || 19 || 0.6 || 0.1 || 6.5 || 5.3 || 11.8 || 2.6 || 1.9
|-
! scope="row" style="text-align:center" | 2014
|style="text-align:center;"|
| 11 || 8 || 4 || 2 || 35 || 41 || 76 || 11 || 20 || 0.5 || 0.2 || 4.4 || 5.1 || 9.5 || 1.4 || 2.5
|- style="background-color: #EAEAEA"
! scope="row" style="text-align:center" | 2015
|style="text-align:center;"|
| 11 || 19 || 4 || 2 || 207 || 130 || 337 || 71 || 43 || 0.2 || 0.1 || 10.9 || 6.8 || 17.7 || 3.7 || 2.3
|-
! scope="row" style="text-align:center" | 2016
|style="text-align:center;"|
| 11 || 21 || 6 || 2 || 225 || 169 || 394 || 77 || 45 || 0.3 || 0.1 || 10.7 || 8.0 || 18.8 || 3.7 || 2.1

|- class="sortbottom"
! colspan=3| Career
! 59
! 20
! 7
! 535
! 395
! 930
! 186
! 128
! 0.3
! 0.1
! 9.1
! 6.7
! 15.8
! 3.2
! 2.2
|}

Post-football
Sheridan is a co-founder of Rixx Eyewear, a sunglasses retailer.

References

External links

Tom Sheridan's profile on the Official WAFL Website
 

1993 births
Living people
Calder Cannons players
Australian rules footballers from Victoria (Australia)
Fremantle Football Club players
Peel Thunder Football Club players
People from Riddells Creek
Greater Western Sydney Giants players